HIFK (a traditional abbreviation of the Swedish name Idrottsföreningen Kamraterna, Helsingfors, English: "Sporting Society Fellows, Helsinki") is a professional ice hockey team based in Helsinki, Finland that plays in the Liiga, the sport's top-level league in Finland. The team plays at Helsinki Ice Hall.

History
The club was founded in 1897 and started participating in ice hockey in 1929. Since then, HIFK has won the Finnish national championship seven times (1969, 1970, 1974, 1980, 1983, 1998, and 2011). HIFK has the highest number of audience in the Liiga and is one of the wealthiest sports clubs in Finland.

The derbies against local rivals Jokerit were often sold out and were in the later years among the fiercest in Nordic ice hockey, but are no longer played following Jokerit's withdrawal from Liiga after the 2013–14 season to join the Russian-based Kontinental Hockey League (KHL). Following a history of even series of games, HIFK won the game total with 106–105 after a 2–1 victory in a classical outdoor game in March 2014, claiming the title of Helsinki's dominion.

HIFK's general manager starting from May 1, 2008, is Jukka Valtanen. He is the successor of Pentti Matikainen, who coached Team Finland to its first hockey Olympic medal (silver) in Calgary 1988.

HIFK won the Finnish national championship in the 2010–11 season when they defeated Espoo Blues.

The championship team from 1998 is widely recognized as one of the best ever to have skated together in the top flight of Finnish ice hockey. Players on the 1998 championship team included a number of future (and former) NHL players – including Tim Thomas, Jan Čaloun, Johan Davidsson, Bob Halkidis, Olli Jokinen, Jere Karalahti, Jarno Kultanen, Brian Rafalski, Christian Ruuttu, Jarkko Ruutu, Kimmo Timonen and Marko Tuomainen.

History
One of the major influences to HIFK was the NHL veteran and Stanley Cup winner Carl Brewer. Hired in 1968 as a playing coach, he advocated a North American style of play which has persisted in HIFK since. Brewer's influence on the way ice hockey is played in Finland led to his posthumous induction to the Finnish Hockey Hall of Fame in 2003.

Team information

Logos and jerseys 
HIFK uses a shield for their logo, with a four pointed star and text I.F.K. and year of formation 1897 on it. They wear red, white and blue colored jerseys, and have worn those colors since their beginnings. For the 1993-94 season, HIFK changed their logo to a five pointed star with text saying HIFK Hockey on it. Unpopular with fans, and HIFK wanting to modernize their brand, changed their logo again in 1996 to a red big cat on a blue circle. Commonly referred to as "petologo" (English: "beast logo") among fans. When the beast logo became HIFK's primary logo for the 1996-97 season, they reintroduced the original shield logo to become their jersey's new shoulder patches. For the 2008-09 season, HIFK made their original shield logo the primary logo once again. It would swap places with the beast logo on the jerseys, making the beast logo their new shoulder patches until 2017, when the beast logo was eliminated from the jerseys entirely.

Home arena 
HIFK play their home games at Helsinki Ice Hall. The stadium opened in 1966, and seats up to 8 200 spectators. The arena was also used and shared by rival team Jokerit until 1997, when they moved to the Hartwall Arena. HIFK is well known for playing classic hard rock music during games in Helsinki Ice Hall.

 Goal song: "Flamethrower" by The J. Geils Band.
 Opening songs: "Hail To The King" by Avenged Sevenfold, "Ghost Riders" by Steve Hunter, and "Whatever You Want" by Status Quo.
 Penalty songs: "Who Are You" by The Who when the visiting team takes a penalty. "Bad To The Bone" by George Thorogood when the home team takes a penalty.
 Other noteworthy songs: "Let's Play Hockey" by Bill Misener, "Red White & Blue" by Lynyrd Skynyrd, "Go IFK" by Jake & Co.

Honors

SM-sarja
  SM-sarja Kanada-malja: 1969, 1970, 1974
  SM-sarja Kanada-malja: 1973, 1975
  SM-sarja Kanada-malja: 1955, 1959, 1971, 1972

SM-liiga
  SM-liiga Kanada-malja: 1980, 1983, 1998, 2011
  SM-liiga Kanada-malja: 1986, 1999, 2016
  SM-liiga Kanada-malja: 1982, 1987, 1988, 1992, 2004, 2018, 2021

International
 Ahearne Cup (1): 1970
 Tampere Cup (2): 1994, 2015
 IIHF European Cup (1): 1980–81
 Nordic Trophy (1): 2008

Other awards for the club:
Harry Lindblad trophy (SM-Liiga regular season winner, since 1975): 2016

Players

Current roster

Honored members

1  Stig Wetzell, 1972–83
5  Heikki Riihiranta, 1967–83
7  Simo Saarinen, 1980–96
9  Kimmo Kuhta, 1996–2013
17  Matti Murto, 1964–83
20  Matti Hagman, 1972–92
22  Mika Kortelainen, 1987–2002
23  Pertti Lehtonen, 1976–98
35  Sakari Lindfors, 1985–2002

NHL alumni

  Peter Ahola
  Tom Askey
  Keith Aulie
  Yohann Auvitu
  Jamie Baker
  Shawn Bates
  Jaroslav Bednar
  Emil Bemström
  Ladislav Benýšek
  Sean Bergenheim
  Tim Bergland
  Tom Bissett
  Henrik Borgström
  Luciano Borsato
  Darren Boyko
  Kip Brennan
  Carl Brewer
  Alex Broadhurst
  Niklas Bäckström
  Jan Čaloun
  Sébastien Centomo
  Dale Clarke
  Johan Davidsson
  Tom Draper
  Parris Duffus
  Corey Elkins
  Miika Elomo
  Rico Fata
  Joe Finley
  Trevor Gillies
  Raymond Giroux
  Nikolai Goldobin
  Markus Granlund
  Mikael Granlund
  Steve Guolla
  Matti Hagman
  Niklas Hagman
  Bob Halkidis
  Jeff Hamilton
  Brett Harkins
  Ilkka Heikkinen
  Miro Heiskanen
  Roope Hintz
  Jan Hrdina
  Ville Husso
  Hannes Hyvönen
  Kari Jalonen
  Mikko Jokela
  Olli Jokinen
  Martti Järventie
  Iiro Järvi
  Jari Kaarela
  Sami Kapanen
  Jere Karalahti
  Michael Keränen
  Otto Koivula
  Jarno Kultanen
  Teemu Laakso
  Kevin Lankinen
  Lucas Lessio
  Joona Luoto
  Ross Lupaschuk
  Toni Lydman
  John Madden
  Ivan Majesky
  Anssi Melametsä
  Sandy Moger
  Johan Motin
  Cory Murphy
  Raymond Murray
  Todd Nelson
  Mika Noronen
  Patrick O'Sullivan
  Joni Ortio
  Iiro Pakarinen
  Ville Peltonen
  Joël Perrault
  Mathieu Perreault
  Janne Pesonen
  Lennart Petrell
  Ilkka Pikkarainen
  Lasse Pirjetä
  Andrej Podkonicky
  Timo Pärssinen
  Kyle Quincey
  Brian Rafalski
  Joonas Rask
  Pekka Rautakallio
  Christian Ruuttu
  Tuomo Ruutu
  Jarkko Ruutu
  Simo Saarinen
  Tony Salmelainen
  Tommi Santala
   Ryan Savoia
  Robert Schnabel
  Roman Simicek
  Ilkka Sinisalo
  Ville Sirén
  Martin Spanhel
  Antti Suomela
  Ryan Thang
  Tim Thomas
  Billy Tibbetts
  Esa Tikkanen
  Kimmo Timonen
  Brad Thiessen
  Marko Tuomainen
  Ryan Vesce
  Tomáš Vokoun
  Roman Vopat
  Peter White
  Petteri Wirtanen
  Marek Židlický

Other notable alumni
  Dave Siciliano, player-coach during the 1971–72 season

References

External links
  

Liiga teams
ice hockey
Sports clubs in Helsinki
Liiga